Beti Bechwa or Beti Biyog (English:- The Daughter seller) is a Bhojpuri play by Playwright Bhikhari Thakur. It was one of several plays written by Thakur based on true events, showing the bad side of society, poverty and Women Empowerment. The play shows the practice of mismatched marriages which are executed between young girls and aged men in exchange of money for the girl's family.

Characters 

 Upato : A young girl
 Lobha : Upato's mother
Chatak : Upato's father
Gotiya : A relative of Chatak
Pandit : A priest
Dulaha : An old man and Upato's Husband
Panch : Judge of village court
Other characters: Some women and Baratis

Plot 
Upato is the daughter of Lobha (mother) and Chatak (father). Due to the poor condition of the family they find it difficult to marry Upato and decided to sell her to any rich family. A person named Jhantul lives in a village named Baklolpur (trans.: City of fools), who is very rich, aged and unmarried. Chatak fixes Upato's marriage with him and took the money. No one knows about this in the village, When the barat arrives, everyone is astonished to see the groom. An old man with no teeth and muscle on his body. 

Lobha wanted to sell her daughter but not with an old groom. Somehow she let the marriage happen and Upato went to Jhatul's home.  Chatak goes to meet Upato after marriage when she asks him that what mistakes did she make that she is facing these. Greedy Chatak had not any answer to this question. After somedays Upato came to her parents' home and Jhatul's also reaches there. In Panchayat it is decided that since Upato is married to Jhatul now she had to live with him. Upato's Mother Lobha blames his father Chatak for this condition of their daughter.

Impact

This play was so impactful that, There are stories of young girls leaving the mandap and running away instead of docilely marrying the old men their parents have taken money from. In Nautanwa village in Uttar Pradesh, after the play was staged there, the villagers sent back a Baraat of an old bridegroom. After a performance in Dhanbad, Jharkhand, some members of the audience marched to a nearby temple and took an oath that they would stop this practice.

References

Indian plays
1925 plays
Bhojpuri-language culture